The Right Person Electorate Coalition (ZKEE) is a political alliance in Mongolia established in 2020 by the National Labour Party, Mongolian Social Democratic Party and Justice Party. According to its statement, the Coalition seeks to correct the distortions of the system in Mongolia, to build a humane and happy society that respects fundamental national interests, history, culture, traditions and unity, and respects human development, the rule of law, justice and social security. The Electorate Movement, which has the motto of "supporting the right people", has expressed its support for the coalition.

Composition

Results

Presidential elections

State Great Khural

In 2020 Mongolian legislative election coalition nominated 53 candidates in 29 constituencies. Only one candidate in the 29th constituency in Khan-Uul District, Togmidyn Dorjkhand, won a mandate.

References

External links

2020 establishments in Mongolia
Political party alliances in Mongolia